Neoanathamna is a genus of moths belonging to the subfamily Olethreutinae of the family Tortricidae.

Species
Neoanathamna cerinus Kawabe, 1978
Neoanathamna negligens Kawabe, 1978
Neoanathamna nipponica (Kawabe, 1976)
Neoanathamna pallens Kawabe, 1980

See also
List of Tortricidae genera

References

External links
tortricidae.com

Tortricidae genera
Olethreutinae